Kamala Girls' High School is a girls' school situated in Southern Avenue, Vivekananda Park, South Kolkata, West Bengal, India, affiliated to the West Bengal Board of Secondary Education for Madhyamik Pariksha (10th Board exams), and to the West Bengal Council of Higher Secondary Education for Higher Secondary Examination (12th Board exams). The founder of the school is Mrs. Kamala Basu. It is a government-sponsored school, aided by West Bengal Government.

See also
Education in India
List of schools in India
Education in West Bengal

References

External links

High schools and secondary schools in West Bengal
Girls' schools in Kolkata
1932 establishments in India
Educational institutions established in 1932